Nationalnyckeln till Sveriges flora och fauna (Swedish for "National Key to Sweden's Flora and Fauna") is a set of books, the first volume of which, Fjärilar: Dagfjärilar (Butterflies, 140 species), appeared on 25 April 2005. The publishing plan comprises 100,000 illustrations spread over more than 100 volumes, to appear over a period of 20 years, listing and providing popular scientific descriptions of all species of plants (flora) and animals (fauna) in Sweden. So large a work has never been published in the history of Swedish literature.

Nationalnyckeln is a popular scientific account produced on contract from the Riksdag by the  Swedish Species Information Centre (ArtDatabanken) at the Swedish University of Agricultural Sciences (SLU) in Uppsala.

References

External links
Nationalnyckeln, official website
SLU Artdatabanken, official website

Swedish encyclopedias
Biology books
Encyclopedias of science
2005 non-fiction books
21st-century encyclopedias
Florae (publication)